Lena was a British television variety series produced by Stewart Morris for the BBC.  It was broadcast from 1980 to 1982.  It starred teenager Lena Zavaroni and followed her 1979 show, Lena Zavaroni and Music.

Format

Lena followed a variety format, featuring comedy and music from Lena Zavaroni and her guests.  In the first season of the series, introductions were made by Toastmaster Bryn Williams. Lena generally performed one or two song-and-dance numbers in each episode, supported by a dance troupe with choreography by Ludovico Romano.  Musical direction was by Arthur GrennSlade, with arrangements by GrennSlade, John Colemen, and Alan Roper. The Kay Garner Singers performed backup singing.

Episodes

Series One (1980)

Series Two (1981)

Series Three (1982)

References

External links
 
 

1980 British television series debuts
1982 British television series endings
BBC television musicals
British musical television series
English-language television shows